
Black books of hours are a type of luxury Flemish illuminated manuscript books of hours using pages of vellum that were soaked with black dye or ink before they were lettered or illustrated, for an unusual and dramatic effect. The text is usually written with gold or silver ink. There are seven surviving examples, all dating from about 1455–1480.

The parchment was soaked in an iron-copper solution and as a result could only be inscribed with gold or silver lettering. The process was both expensive and corrosive to parchment, so surviving examples are few and generally in poor condition. These manuscripts were produced in the mid- to late-15th century for high-ranking members of the court of Philip the Good and Charles the Bold. Given their novel visual appeal, they were probably prized more highly than more conventional illuminated books.

The Burgundian court had a preference for dark, somber colourisation, and the extant works in this style were mostly commissioned for them. Only the  wealthiest nobility could have afforded such books, and a contemporary taste for mournful colours—often reflected in the styles of the day—was reflected in the black, gold and silver of the manuscripts. Some of the miniatures in the books, notably in the Morgan library Black Hours, are linked to a follower of Willem Vrelant due to stylistic resemblance to faces from some of his known works.

Extant
The surviving manuscripts of this type include;
Black Hours, Morgan MS 493, Morgan Library, New York
 Black Hours, Hispanic Society, New York, c 1458, unfinished, now in the collection of the Hispanic Society of America in New York
 Black Hours of Galeazzo Maria Sforza, Austrian National Library, Vienna

 (some pages only) Hours of Mary of Burgundy, Austrian National Library

Gallery

References

Notes

Sources

 Facsimile Ausgabe von Pierpont Morgan Library, New York, M. 493. Luzern: Faksimile Verlag Luzern, 2001
 Bousmanne, Bernard (ed). Black Book of Hours; Scientific commentary. New York: Pierpont Morgan Library, 2001
 De Schryver, Antoine. The Prayer Book of Charles the Bold. CF: Getty Publications, 2008. 
 Harthan, John. Book of Hours, Random House, 2008. 
 Ulrike Jenni und Dagmar Thoss, Das Schwartze Gebetbuch. Codex 1856 der Österreichische Nationalbibliothek in Wien (Faksimile), Frankfurt am Main, Insel-Verlag, 1982
 Walther, Ingo. Codices Illustres. Berlin: Taschen Verlag, 2001.